General Sir William Purvis Wright,  (16 July 1846 – 30 April 1910) was a Royal Marines officer who served as Deputy Adjutant-General Royal Marines.

Military career
Wright was commissioned into the Royal Marine Light Infantry on 31 December 1862. He served in the sloop HMS Narcissus in a detached squadron between September 1874 and May 1877 and subsequently wrote a book about his experiences at sea. He became Assistant Adjutant-General Royal Marines on 10 May 1897, and was promoted to the rank of major-general on 14 March 1900. Two years later he was appointed Deputy Adjutant-General Royal Marines (the professional head of the Royal Marines) in June 1902, before retiring in June 1907. As Deputy Adjutant-General he was categorized supernumerary from early October 1902, to allow for other officers to be promoted in the ordinary ranks.

References

 

 

1846 births
1910 deaths
Royal Marines generals
Knights Commander of the Order of the Bath